Allium hollandicum, the Persian onion or Dutch garlic, is a species of flowering plant native to Iran and Kyrgyzstan but widely cultivated as an ornamental because of its umbels of attractive purple flowers. It is reportedly naturalized in Saint Louis County, Minnesota.

The popular cultivar ‘Purple Sensation’ has gained the Royal Horticultural Society’s Award of Garden Merit. It prefers moist, fertile soil in full sun.

References

hollandicum
Flora of Iran
Flora of Kyrgyzstan
Plants described in 1993